The Djarn Djarns is a 2005 Australian short film, written and directed by Wayne Blair.

Synopsis
The film tells the story of an eleven-year-old Aboriginal boy, Frankie Dollar, as he comes to terms with his father's death. The name of the film derives from the name of the dance group that Frankie leads.

Awards
The Djarn Djarns was the winner of the 2005 Crystal Bear Award Best Short Film as part of the Kinderfilmfest, in the Berlin International Film Festival. In Australia, the film premiered at the Sydney Indigenous Art Festival (See: Contemporary Indigenous Australian art) in 2005 before screening on Special Broadcasting Service (SBS).

External links
Australian Film Commission
Creative Spirits

2005 films
Australian drama short films
2005 short films
2000s English-language films
2000s Australian films
Films about Aboriginal Australians